The Princess Anne Hospital is a maternity hospital in Southampton, England, adjacent to Southampton General Hospital. It is operated by the University Hospital Southampton NHS Foundation Trust.

History
The hospital opened by Princess Anne on 28 March 1981. The hospital was the location for the first two series of Channel 4's One Born Every Minute broadcast in 2010 and 2011. A digital breast screening unit was established at the hospital in September 2013.

See also
 List of hospitals in England

References

External links 
 
 Inspection reports from the Care Quality Commission

Hospitals in Hampshire
Buildings and structures in Southampton
NHS hospitals in England
Maternity hospitals in the United Kingdom